Voynovo is a rural locality (village) in Tonshalovskoye Rural Settlement, Cherepovetsky District, Vologda Oblast, Russia. The population was 37 as of 2002. There are 4 streets.

Geography 
Voynovo is located 12 km northeast of Cherepovets (the district's administrative centre) by road. Tonshalovo is the nearest rural locality.

References 

Rural localities in Cherepovetsky District